Eliot Zigmund (born April 14, 1945) is an American jazz drummer, who has worked extensively as a session musician.

Biography
Zigmund studied at Mannes School of Music and City College of New York, where he graduated in 1969. After moving to California, he found work in the 1970s playing with Ron McClure, Steve Swallow, Art Lande, Mike Nock, Mel Martin, and Vince Guaraldi. He moved back to New York City in 1974, where he played with Bill Evans from 1975 to 1978. He also played with Eddie Gómez, Bennie Wallace, Richard Beirach, Jim Hall, Chet Baker, Stan Getz, Fred Hersch, and Red Mitchell before the end of the 1970s.

He played with Don Friedman from 1979 to 1984, and then joined a trio with Michel Petrucciani until the late 1980s. After this he worked both as a leader in small ensembles and as a sideman with Gary Peacock (1980), Carl Barry (1982), Keith Greko (1985), Eiji Nakayama (1988), and Stefan Karlsson (1995).

Zigmund has also done work as a session player for Neil Sedaka, Dionne Warwick, and The Pointer Sisters, among others.

A resident of Teaneck, New Jersey, Zigmund has taught at William Paterson College and New York University.

Discography

As leader
 Time Was (SteepleChase, 2017)
 Live at Smalls (SmallsLIVE, 2018)

As sideman
With Bill Evans
 Crosscurrents (Fantasy, 1978)
 Affinity (Warner Bros, 1979)
 I Will Say Goodbye (Fantasy, 1980)
 You Must Believe in Spring (Warner Bros., 1981)
 From the 70's (Fantasy, 1983)
 The Paris Concert (Fantasy, 1989)
 In His Own Way (West Wind, 1989)
 The Secret Sessions (Milestone, 1996)
 On a Monday Evening (Fantasy, 2017)

With Vince Guaraldi
 It's a Mystery, Charlie Brown (television soundtrack, 1974)
 Live on the Air (D&D, 2008)

With Michel Petrucciani
 Live at the Village Vanguard  (Concord Jazz, 1985)
 Live at the Village Vanguard Vol. 2 (Video Artists, 1982)
 Pianism (Blue Note, 1986)

With others
 Joshua Breakstone, No One New (Capri, 2009)
 Don Friedman, Half & Half (Insights, 1986)
 Eddie Gomez, Down Stretch (Trio, 1976)
 Amy London, Bridges (FiveCut, 2014)
 Giovanni Mirabassi, Tribute to Bill (Star Prod  2011)
 Gary Peacock, Shift in the Wind (ECM, 1980)
 Marvin Stamm, Elegance (2001)
 Christina von Bulow, The Good Life  (Stunt, 2014)
 Christina von Bulow, On the Brink of a Lovely Song (Storyville, 2018)

References

Sources

External links

American jazz drummers
Musicians from New York (state)
Living people
1945 births
City College of New York alumni
Mannes School of Music alumni
People from Teaneck, New Jersey
20th-century American drummers
American male drummers
Jazz musicians from New York (state)
20th-century American male musicians
American male jazz musicians